William Lawrence Gardner (May 13, 1886 – March 11, 1976) was a third baseman in Major League Baseball. From 1908 through 1924, Gardner played for the Boston Red Sox, Philadelphia Athletics, and Cleveland Indians. He was a four-time World Series champion.

Biography
Gardner was born in Enosburg, Vermont, and attended Enosburg High School. He began playing baseball in the Franklin County League and attended the University of Vermont where he played baseball for three years. He was the first player out of the University of Vermont to play in the American League. Gardner was signed by the Boston Red Sox as an amateur free agent in 1908, and played his first professional game on June 25, 1908.

He played most of his prime in the dead-ball era, as the third baseman on several successful Red Sox teams. He helped the Red Sox to victories in the 1912, 1915, and 1916 World Series. He led Boston with 5 RBIs in the 1912 Series and hit his team's only home run. In the 10th inning of the final game, the same inning that included Fred Snodgrass and Chief Meyers making critical fielding mistakes and giving the Red Sox two extra outs to work with, Gardner drove in Steve Yerkes with the series-winning sacrifice fly. Gardner homered in consecutive games of the 1916 Series, including a three-run inside-the-park homer in Game 4. The two home runs matched his regular season total.

Gardner played a key role on the pennant-winning 1920 Indians, leading the team in RBIs (118) as well as games played (154) and at-bats (597). However, he also was a dismal 3-for-23 in stolen base attempts. He went 5-for-24 in the 1920 World Series, which Cleveland won, 5 games to 2. Gardner was on the winning side in all four of his World Series appearances. Gardner batted only .198 (17-for-86) in 25 World Series games but did score 9 runs, with 3 doubles, 2 triples, 3 home runs, 13 RBI and 4 walks.

His best season was 1921, when he achieved career-highs in batting average (.319), RBIs (120), runs scored (101), and hits (187).

Gardner batted left-handed and threw right-handed. In his 17-season career, Larry Gardner posted a .289 batting average with 27 home runs and 934 RBI in 1923 games.

Gardner was inducted into Vermont's Athletic Hall of Fame in 1969. After his retirement, he returned to the University of Vermont as a baseball coach and athletic director from 1929 to 1951.

Death and legacy
Gardner died on March 11, 1976, in St. George, Vermont. 

In its December 27, 1989, issue commemorating the millennium, Sports Illustrated named Gardner as one of the Top 50 Vermont athletes of the 20th century. Gardner was inducted to the Boston Red Sox Hall of Fame in 2000. In 2012 Gardner was inducted into the Vermont Sports Hall of Fame.

See also
 List of Major League Baseball career triples leaders
 List of Major League Baseball career stolen bases leaders

References

External links
 
 University of Vermont Athletics Hall of Fame profile
 Vermont Sports Hall of Fame profile

 SABR Biographies: Larry Gardner
 Baseball Almanac

1886 births
1976 deaths
Major League Baseball third basemen
Boston Red Sox players
Philadelphia Athletics players
Cleveland Indians players
Vermont Catamounts athletic directors
Vermont Catamounts baseball coaches
Vermont Catamounts baseball players
Lynn Shoemakers players
Asheville Tourists players
Dallas Steers players
Asheville Tourists managers
Baseball players from Vermont
People from Enosburgh, Vermont